Bally is a borough in Berks County, Pennsylvania, United States. The population was 1,090 at the 2010 census.

History
Bally was originally called Goshenhoppen, possibly deriving from an Indian word meaning meeting place. Others claim the name derives from German settlers calling the area their haven or Hafen in German, eventually becoming Goshenhoppen. Mennonites and Catholics settled it in the early 18th century.  Clergyman Ulrich Beidler erected the first house of worship, the Mennonite Church in 1731.  Father Theodore Schneider, a Jesuit priest, came to the area in 1741 and established what would be just the third Catholic mission church in the 13 original colonies.  On land received from the Mennonite community, Father Schneider built St. Paul's Chapel in 1743.  St. Paul's is now known as the Most Blessed Sacrament Church, and it is the oldest existing Catholic place of worship in Pennsylvania and the fourth oldest Catholic structure in the thirteen original colonies.

In 1743, Father Schneider started a Catholic school at the mission church.  The school, originally called St. Aloysius Academy, also marked the beginning of Catholic education in the 13 original colonies.  After several name changes, it is currently known as St. Francis Academy, and is the oldest currently operating co-educational Catholic school in the nation.

To reflect the many churches in the town (as there were also several other churches in the area of different denominations), Goshenhoppen was renamed Churchville.  When the post office was established in 1883, the townsfolk changed the name to "Bally" in memory of Fr. Augustine Bally, S.J., a Catholic pastor beloved by all, who had died the previous year. Bally was incorporated as a borough in 1912, with Henry Eddinger, son of Frederick K. and Sophia (Miller) Eddinger, appointed as the first Burgess. Bally has traditionally been a home of many Pennsylvania Dutch settlers and their descendants.

In 1912, Bally resident Annie Clemmer Funk, a Mennonite missionary to India, died during the sinking of the RMS Titanic.  She was en route to Bally to visit her ailing mother, and reportedly gave up her seat in a lifeboat to another passenger.

Economy

There are numerous business and industry in town, some of which are known internationally.  Among the largest industries are Bally Ribbon Mills, Bally Block Co. and PB Heat LLC.  Two other major manufacturers, Great American Knitting Mills, now Gold Toe Socks, and Bally Case and Cooler, now Bally Refrigerated Boxes, were founded in Bally, and were located there for decades. The area is also well known for its agriculture. Bally lies in the heart of an area named Butter Valley, extending from Hereford through Bally to Boyertown. The name is due to the large number of dairy farms in the valley.

Italian artist, furniture designer, and metal sculpture musician Harry Bertoia settled in the area, and established his Bertoia Studio on Main Street in Bally.

Geography
Bally is located at  (40.401044, -75.588365). It is surrounded by Washington Township.

Demographics

As of the 2010 census, Bally had a population of 1090.  The median age was 41.9.  The racial and ethnic composition of the population was 96.8% non-Hispanic white, 0.6% black or African American, 0.1% Native American, 0.6% Asian, 0.8% reporting two or more races and 1.4% Hispanic or Latino.

As of the 2000 census, there were 1,062 people, 413 households, and 304 families residing in the borough. The population density was 2,030.4 people per square mile (788.5/km2). There were 426 housing units at an average density of 814.5 per square mile (316.3/km2). The racial makeup of the borough was 98.78% White, 0.47% African American, 0.19% Native American, 0.47% Asian, and 0.09% from two or more races. Hispanic or Latino of any race were 0.28% of the population.

There were 413 households, out of which 28.8% had children under the age of 18 living with them, 59.3% were married couples living together, 10.9% had a female householder with no husband present, and 26.2% were non-families. 22.8% of all households were made up of individuals, and 12.6% had someone living alone who was 65 years of age or older. The average household size was 2.57 and the average family size was 2.98.

In the borough, the population was spread out, with 22.6% under the age of 18, 7.9% from 18 to 24, 27.7% from 25 to 44, 23.0% from 45 to 64, and 18.8% who were 65 years of age or older. The median age was 39 years. For every 100 females there were 100.0 males. For every 100 females age 18 and over, there were 96.7 males.

The median income for a household in the borough was $49,063, and the median income for a family was $56,406. Males had a median income of $37,750 versus $25,000 for females. The per capita income for the borough was $24,537. About 0.7% of families and 1.6% of the population were below the poverty line, including 2.2% of those under age 18 and none of those age 65 or over.

Public services
The school district for the borough is the Boyertown Area School District. The Eastern Berks Fire Department, the Bally Community Ambulance, and the Bally Police Department offer emergency services in the borough.
The current Mayor is David C. Schott.

Transportation

Pennsylvania Route 100 is the only numbered highway serving Bally. It follows Main Street along a southwest-northeast alignment through the center of the borough.

References

External links

 Borough of Bally

1912 establishments in Pennsylvania
Boroughs in Berks County, Pennsylvania
Mennonitism in Pennsylvania
Populated places established in 1731